Mission Istanbul is a 2008 Indian Hindi-language action thriller film starring Vivek Oberoi, Shriya Saran and Zayed Khan.  The film, directed by Apoorva Lakhia, features Abhishek Bachchan in a special appearance.

The film is based on an organisation Al Johara which bears a resemblance to Qatar-based news channel Al Jazeera, which was criticized by the White House as being an outlet for terrorists. The film deals with the role of Al Johara based in Turkey, a NATO country with troops engaged in Afghanistan, and the role of the Indian Intelligence agency R.A.W.

Plot
The story is based on the life of India's top news reporter Vikas Sagar (Zayed Khan). He would do anything for his news report, even risk his life. Ambitious, popular, and professional, Vikas is considered one of the most promising journalists in the business. Due to this reason, Owais Hussain (Suniel Shetty), a senior producer at the controversial news channel Al Johara, offers him a job as the head of the channel's India bureau. Vikas is going through a divorce with his wife Anjali (Shriya Saran), and getting his mind off things, Vikas accepts the offer and flies to Istanbul to start work for Al Johara. Vikas then meets Dr. Lisa Lobo (Shweta Bhardwaj), at a party, Lisa who is headed to Istanbul to attend a medical convention, it is later revealed that Lisa is a R.A.W. agent looking forward to recruiting Vikas.

Once in Istanbul, Vikas meets with the head of Al Johara, Ghazni (Nikitin Dheer), who has business interests all over the world but whose obsession these days is Al Johara as an instrument to shape world events. There is only one word of caution to Vikas, and that's never ever to venture onto the 13th floor known as the Catacomb. He once again meets Owais, who tells him that he is looking forward to quitting his job and settling down with his Irish girlfriend. Ghazni sends Vikas and Owais on an assignment to cover kidnapped journalists in one of terrorist Abu Nazir's terrorist-camps in Afghanistan.

The two meet Abu Nazir's brother, Khalil (Shabbir Ahluwalia), who tries to scare Vikas by killing one of the kidnapped journalists and is later revealed to be Ghazni's right hand. Vikas, shocked, takes action and fights Khalil's thugs. Khalil then shoots Owais multiple times leading to his death. Vikas jumps on a helicopter and rides away, seeing Owais get killed. Reeling at this close encounter with terrorism and watching a brutal killing, Vikas arrives in Istanbul in a daze. Ghazni finds out about Owais' death and holds a funeral. At the funeral, Vikas is approached by a former Turkish commando, Rizwan Khan (Vivek Oberoi), who hints that no senior employee has ever quit Al Johara and rattles off a list of Al Johara employees who had been killed in terrorist attacks within days of there being of rumours of their plans to quit or their resumes circulating in the job market.

Vikas remembers Owais telling him that he wants to quit his job. This makes Vikas suspicious about Al Johara being connected to terrorism. Before asking any more questions, Rizwan Khan disappears. Vikas discreetly runs a check on the names rattled off by Rizwan and discovered he was indeed telling the truth. Five Al Johara reporters before Owais had either died in a car bomb explosion, abducted and killed or simply found dead. He slowly notices that not everything is as simple as it looks in the offices of Al Johara, especially when he seems to bump into strangers whose faces he soon recognizes as suicide bombers in a couple of terrorist attacks.
Vikas, confused, accidentally goes to the forbidden 13th floor of the building and is tortured by Al Johara's staff. Lisa arrives and saves him by taking him away. Vikas goes back to his apartment only to find his passport, documents and money all missing. Later on, while buying a falafel roll, he finds a note in his pocket telling him he is being followed by Ghazni's men. While running from Ghazni's men, Vikas bumps into Rizwan, who tells him he is being tracked wherever he goes and what he does, so then Rizwan beats up Ghazni's men and removes the trackers. Rizwan tells Vikas that Abu Nazir is actually dead but being kept alive by Al Johara through videotapes by using digital images of the terrorist and doctoring old footage because the man who killed Abu Nazir was indeed Rizwan himself as he had lost his family in a blast.

Rizwan and Vikas plan to expose Al Johara by breaking into the 13th floor. First, they break the hands of a man who Vikas had seen authorising the special lift. Rizwan shoots numerous guards on his way to the 13th floor while covering Vikas. Once they reach the 13th floor, Vikas finds out the truth about how Al Johara helps terrorism increase and what they do and saves it on a pen drive while subsequently erasing the data and leaving a virus on Al Johara's computers. At the same time, Rizwan is covering Vikas by shooting any guards that come their way. Lisa helps them escape the Al Johara building and tells them that she informed Ghazni about Vikas' activities earlier so that he could trust her, but actually, she is working for RAW. Ghazni sends his men to get the pen drive back, but his men are brutally beaten up by Vikas, Rizwan and Lisa. Ghazni kills Zahir (a man that came to retrieve the pen drive) and frames the trio for the murder and putting a bounty on their heads.

Vikas calls Anjali, who tells him that she is coming to Istanbul to pick him up. This call allows Ghazni to track Vikas, and hence he and Rizwan are forced to fend off the police. Rizwan disappears, while Vikas is repeatedly chased by cops but manages to escape. On one occasion, he meets the Indian Ambassador and tries to tell her the truth, but she does not seem to believe him because Ghazni is a very respected man in Turkey. While escaping, Vikas runs into Rizwan, who takes him to the airport where Anjali is coming. Rizwan forces Vikas to let Anjali to go with Ghazni and his men because his informants are everywhere, and Vikas will probably get killed by Ghazni if he is spotted. Rizwan realises that Lisa has not yet called them and hence goes to her house with Vikas only to find her killed by Khalil. While dying, she gives her boss' contact to them, but by the time Vikas and Rizwan get there, he too is dead. Vikas then meets Ghazni and his men who are holding Anjali hostage. Anjali is tortured by Ghazni, and his men, and so is Vikas, especially when he refuses to give the pen drive. Eventually, he gives it to them because Khalil was about to shoot Anjali. After the pen drive download was complete, Khalil attempts to kill Vikas and Anjali, but an explosive fitted by Rizwan blows up, allowing Vikas to free himself. Vikas and Ghazni engage in a lengthy fight as well as Rizwan and Khalil, where Vikas and Rizwan manage to kill off their opponents. In the end, Vikas and Anjali are reunited, and Rizwan unexpectedly turns up at their place.

Cast
 Zayed Khan as Vikas Sagar, Anjali's husband
 Vivek Oberoi as Rizwan Khan, Vikas' friend at Istanbul and a former Turkish commando
 Shriya Saran as Anjali Sagar, Vikas' wife
 Nikitin Dheer as Al Ghazni, head of Al Johara and the main antagonist
 Shabbir Ahluwalia as Khalil Nazir, Abu Nazir's brother and Ghazni's right hand
 Suniel Shetty as Owais Hussain (special appearance)
 Shweta Bhardwaj as Dr. Liza Lobo, an undercover RAW agent in Istanbul
 Pia Trivedi in an item number
 Brent Mendenhall as President George W. Bush
 Omar Abdullah in a Special Appearance.
 Khalil Ahmed as Osama Bin Laden
 Rosy as Secretary to the US President
 Abhishek Bachchan in an item number "Nobody Like You"

Production 
Zayed Khan's role was initially meant to be played by Bobby Deol. Tusshar Kapoor was offered a villain role but turned that role down which then went to Nikitin Dheer.

Soundtrack 

A soundtrack for Mission Istaanbul was released prior to the film and is available for retail. The soundtrack closely follows the theme of the film spanning a wide variety of music directors such as Mika Singh, Hamza Farooqui, Chirantan Bhatt, Shamir Tandon and Anu Malik. The album consists of 9 songs, including 3 remix versions.

Track listing

Critical Reception
Mission Istaanbul received negative reviews from critics. Bollywood Hungama critic Taran Adarsh gave it 1.5 out of 5 stars. The Hindu stated that Mission Istaanbul has no sting. Rediff.com gave it 1 star.

Box Office

References

External links
 

2008 films
Films scored by Anu Malik
2000s Hindi-language films
Journalism adapted into films
Films scored by Shamir Tandon
Films scored by Mika Singh
Films shot in Jordan
Films shot in India
Indian action war films
2000s action war films
2008 action thriller films
Indian spy thriller films
2000s spy thriller films
Films set in Turkey
Films set in Afghanistan
Films about terrorism in India
Indian action thriller films
Films about the Research and Analysis Wing
Balaji Motion Pictures films
Films directed by Apoorva Lakhia